Woodward Houses are two historic homes located at Wilmington, New Castle County, Delaware. The house at 701 West Street was built about 1745, and is a -story, three bay, quarried granite dwelling with a gable roof.  It has an L-shaped, side-hall plan. The house at 703 West Street was built about 1760, and is a -story, three-bay, stuccoed stone dwelling with a gable roof. It is three feet shorter in both length and width than 701.  Its interior was altered in the mid-19th century and then in the 1930s to accommodate apartment dwellings. They are
excellent examples of the Georgian style. The houses were probably built by Joseph Woodward, a Quaker ropemaker from West Chester, Pennsylvania.  There is a legend that the
house at 703 contains a hearthstone which was a section of the platform where Thomas Jefferson stood to read the Declaration of Independence to the people of Philadelphia.

The houses were added to the National Register of Historic Places in 1979.

References

Houses on the National Register of Historic Places in Delaware
Georgian architecture in Delaware
Houses completed in 1745
Houses completed in 1760
Houses in Wilmington, Delaware
National Register of Historic Places in Wilmington, Delaware
1745 establishments in the Thirteen Colonies